Saint Thérèse of the Little Flower Catholic Church is a parish of the Roman Catholic Diocese of Reno, in the U.S. state of Nevada. A Catholic elementary school is also located on the grounds, called Little Flower School.

History
The parish was established in 1948 and is in its third location. Until 1978 the church itself was housed in a brick building at Wells Avenue and Vassar Street in Reno, Nevada; the building became a bank branch.

The church was among those visited by relics of Saint Thérèse of Lisieux. This church is one of seven in the United States to enshrine a relic of Our Lady of Guadalupe.

The Little Flower School opened in 1962, and teaches grade K - 8.

Notable alumni include Governor Brian Sandoval.

Gallery

References

External links 
 Official website of Saint Therese of the Little Flower Catholic Church
 Official website of Little Flower School of Reno

Churches in Reno, Nevada
Roman Catholic churches in Nevada